Woodsonville is an unincorporated community in Hart County, Kentucky, in the United States.

History
A post office was established at Woodsonville in 1818, and remained in operation until it was discontinued in 1906. The community was named for Thomas Woodson.

References

Unincorporated communities in Hart County, Kentucky
Unincorporated communities in Kentucky